Nether Horsburgh Castle is a ruined tower house near Cardrona, in the Scottish Borders, in the former county of Peebleshire. Access may be gained by permission from the adjoining farmstead, Nether Horsburgh Farm.

Description 
The remains of Nether Horsburgh Castle consist of a ruined, 16th-century rectangular tower-house, at the foot of a rolling valley overlooking the River Tweed, with the Hope Burn flowing just a few meters to the east. Originally, the tower had an adjoining courtyard and ranges of buildings, traces of which can still be seen to the north of the tower.

It is thought that the tower rose to a height of four stories, with an entrance situated at ground level on the northeast side of the building. This led into a vaulted cellar, studded with slit window apertures. Evidence suggests that access to the upper floors was gained by a staircase situated in the east wall.

All that remains of this is a small fragment of the northern segment, which now forms a part of the field boundary in which the castle stands.

The site is protected as a scheduled monument.

History
The castle was built and occupied by the Borders family of Horsburgh, and was later sold to Sir Robert Stewart of Shillingshaws, due to diminished family fortunes.

Other castles owned by the Horsburgh family are to be found in the same part of Peebleshire. This is Horsburgh Castle, also of the 16th century, and just north of Peebles, high on the side of Mailingsland Hill, stands the remains of Hutchinfield Tower. A very dilapidated oblong block, again this is of the 16th century.

Photographs of the ruins

References 

Salter, Mike (1985). Discovering Scottish Castles. Shire Publications Ltd. .

See also
List of places in the Scottish Borders

Ruined castles in the Scottish Borders
Scheduled Ancient Monuments in the Scottish Borders
Tower houses in Scotland